K1 Speed is a Californian company that operates go-kart tracks. The company was co-founded in 2003 by American racing driver Boris Said and Susan Danglard, who had previously worked in the fashion industry. That same year, K1 Speed opened their first go-kart track outside San Diego, California.

In late 2018, K1 Speed said that they were partnering with virtual and augmented reality brand Oculus to use their Oculus Rift virtual reality headset and several cameras monitoring a track to give K1 Speed's go-kart users a virtual racing experience.

K1 Speed has 59 locations across the United States, Canada, Mexico, Dominican Republic, South Korea, Puerto Rico, Kuwait, Italy, China and France.

References 

2003 establishments in California
Companies based in California